Ban Khung Taphao is a village in the Khung Taphao subdistrict of Mueang Uttaradit of Uttaradit Province, Thailand.

Etymology 
The first element ban, (Thai: บ้าน) means village.  The second element khung, (Thai: คุ้ง) means bend of watercourse.  The third element taphao, (Thai: ตะเภา) means a sailing ship.

Geography 
Ban Khung Taphao lies in the northern portion of Tambon Khung Taphao on the Nan River.

Government 
The current village headman of Ban Khung Taphao is Phu Yai Ban Somchai Samphaothong (Thai:สมชาย สำเภาทอง).  The headman is an elected post, followed by appointment by the Ministry of the Interior.

Culture 

Residents are Theravada Buddhists.  Ancestor worship is practiced, and homes often have shrines dedicated to elders of the family who have died; offerings of food and drink are placed beside the shrines.

Children attend school at the Ban Khung Taphao School.  They travel to Ban Khung Taphao School by bicycle or on foot.  Traditional ethnic clothing is no longer worn by villagers, other than for certain religious ceremonies.

External links
 Ban Khung Taphao history  
 Wat Khung Taphao

References

Populated places in Uttaradit province